Tito Yupanqui is a town in the La Paz Department, Bolivia.  It was named after an indigenous  artist, Francisco Tito Yupanqui, a 16th-century wood sculptor who sculptured a famous statue of the Blessed Virgin Mary, known as Our Lady of Candles (Nuestra Senora de la Virgen de Candelaria).

References 

  Instituto Nacional de Estadistica de Bolivia  (INE)

Populated places in La Paz Department (Bolivia)